Arnold Fielder Downer  (4 February 1895 – 16 July 1984) was a New Zealand civil engineer, construction contractor and company director who founded the Downer Group in 1933. He was born in Alexandra, Victoria, Australia, on 4 February 1895.

Early life

Downer was born at Alexandra, Victoria, Australia, on 4 February 1895, the son of Edwin Harry Downer (died 24 October 1945), a builder, and his wife, Mary Ann McMinn (died 13 January 1956).

In 1899 the family emigrated to New Zealand in 1899 and settled in Feilding, where Downer attended Manchester Street School and the Feilding District High School, before completing his higher education at Wanganui Technical College.

After leaving high school he obtained a cadetship in 1913 with the Public Works Department and was employed in their Dunedin office on a number of projects in Otago and Southland.

World War I
He enlisted in the New Zealand Expeditionary Force in September 1915. Commissioned from the ranks he served in Egypt with the Corps of New Zealand Engineers, and later in France with the New Zealand Field Artillery. He later served in the army of occupation in Germany. Upon his discharge in early 1919 he opted to stay in Europe and studied civil engineering at the School of Engineering at London University in London for a period before returning to New Zealand later that year. After his return to New Zealand he continued his engineering studies at the Canterbury University College which allowed him to be registered as a civil engineer.

Public Works Department
After obtaining his registration Downer rejoined the Public Works Department. He undertook a number of railway surveys in the Hawkes Bay and Northland before in 1927 he was appointed engineer in charge of the Wellington–Tawa Flat deviation of the main trunk railway line. This deviation included the construction of three miles of tunnels, experience which was to stand him in good stead as much of his later career involved tunneling activities.

Mount Victoria Tunnel
In 1930 Downer left the Public Works Department to take a position with the Hansford and Mills Construction Company as their engineer in charge of tunnelling on the construction of  Wellington's Mount Victoria road tunnel.  It was the company's first tunnelling project. Despite having already completed a number of large projects in New Zealand, the company's lack of tunnelling experience and the financial pressures of the Depression drove it into liquidation.
The company's receiver asked Downer to remain on the project and appointed him project manager. Downer was able to complete the project within its original planned completion date.

Downer & Co.
His work on the Mount Victoria tunnel had introduced Downer to Arch McLean, George McLean (who had supplied some of the plant for the tunnel) and Billy Mill. After the tunnel was completed in 1931 Downer and George McLean worked together on the development and operation of an alluvial gold claim at Ruatapu on the West Coast. When this project folded after 18 months Downer, Arch McLean, George McLean and Billy Mill in preparation for a bid for potential work with the Dunedin City Council decided to formalise their working relationship and formed Downer & Company on the 5 July 1933.

The new company subsequently won the contract with the Dunedin City, which was for construction of a surge tank and tunnel on the Waipori Hydroelectric Scheme. The work was started in 1934 and completed in 1938.
In 1935 they won a contract to construct an 8.5-mile-long access road from Upper Takaka to the Cobb Power Station.

Homer Tunnel
When the Public Works Department restarted work on the Homer Tunnel after having previously stopped work Downers and Co were contracted in 1937 to drive a pilot tunnel. Downers provided the labour and management while the Public Works Department provided all equipment and material. Arnold Downer (accompanied by his wife) spent time at the site supervising the work.

World War II
In November 1941 Arnold Downer as project manager for the construction of new airfields near Namaka (Nausori) on Viti Levu Island in Fiji.

Three airfields, each with a runway measuring 2,100 m (7000 ft) long by 152.4 m (500 ft) wide, with revetments and servicing areas, were built by a workforce that at its peak reached 3,000 men. With work continuing under lights at night due to the urgency the first was ready by 15 January 1942 and the other two by 15 April 1942.

Following the completion of the airfields on Fiji Arnold Downer was then involved in the construction of airfields at Aitutaki and Penrhyn in the Cook Islands.

Roxburgh hydro power station
In July 1952 the New Zealand government had awarded a contract to build the Roxburgh hydro-electric power station to an overseas consortium headed by Holland, Hannen & Cubitts of England with S A Conrad Zschokke as junior partners. Prior to their involvement with the Roxburgh project Hannen, Holland & Cubitts experience had been limited to commercial and residential buildings. Zschokke who had expertise in the construction of hydraulic structures were limited to only providing engineering services while Cubitts personnel filled all the management roles.

By 1953 it was necessary to introduce power rationing in the South Island due to  the shortage of  generation. In early 1954 with the consortium making poor progress on the completion of Roxburgh the government decided that this, as well as strained relationships between the consortium and the government's supervising engineers, could not continue. They decided that the consortium needed as a partner a New Zealand company which offered proven reliability and local knowledge. As a result, they requested that Downers and Company send directors to attend in two days time a meeting at the Prime Minister's summer cottage on 24 April 1954. At this meeting which was attended by representatives of the consortium, Arnold Downer and Arch McLean were asked by the government for Downer and Company to enter the consortium as the managing partner with a 25% interest. They agreed, which lead to the existing contract being cancelled and a schedule of rates contract agreed upon with the renamed Cubitts Zschokke Downer.
Other than submission of an unsuccessful tender to undertake the entire project Downer and Company's only involvement in the project had been the construction of the concrete plant.
 
As a result of the forming of this new consortium Arnold Downer was put in charge of all site activities. He was able to oversee the successful diversion of the Clutha river, before in July 1954  replacing 20 senior consortium staff that he had inherited with people of this choosing, many from Morrison-Knudson Co. Under Downer's management the pace of construction increased, despite reducing the workforce.
 
By 11:20 am on 23 July 1956 the lake had filled to the crest of the spillway water. With a desperate shortage of electricity affecting the South Island, commissioning of the first of eight machines to be installed in the station immediately commenced. Once the engineers were satisfied that the machine was fit for service it was connected at 6 pm to the national grid. By the end of the next day, a second machine had completed commissioning and was also connected to the national grid. 
The commissioning of Roxburgh removed the need for power restrictions in the South Island and ensured a surplus of power for many years.

Later career
Arnold Downer had long been a director of William Cable Holdings, a long established company which by the mid 1950s was looking for opportunities to expand its construction activities. As it seemed advantageous to both parties Downer and Company merged with, and became a major subsidiary of, William Cable Holdings in 1954.

Downer retired as managing director of Downer and Company in 1962 with Callum McLean replacing him.  In 1964 the William Cable Holdings changed its name to Cable, Price, Downer. Downer remained a director of Cable, Price, Downer until 1970.

Downer was president of the New Zealand Institution of Engineers in 1959 to 60. After retiring as managing director of Downers and Company he spent three years on the council of the DSIR.

Arnold Downer died in Wellington on 16 July 1984, survived by his wife and nephew.

Awards and honours
In the 1956 Queen's Birthday Honours, Downer was appointed a Companion of the Order of the British Empire, in recognition of his services as engineer in charge of various public works.

Personal life
Arnold Downer married concert singer Phyllis Lorimer Massey in Sydney on 14 September 1927. The couple had no children, but brought up a young nephew of Phyllis's following the death of his mother.

References

Further reading

Australian emigrants to New Zealand
New Zealand Commanders of the Order of the British Empire
1895 births
1984 deaths
People from Alexandra, Victoria
20th-century New Zealand engineers